The Screen Actors Guild Award for Outstanding Performance by a Male Actor in a Drama Series is an award given by the Screen Actors Guild to honor the finest acting achievements in dramatic television.

Winners and nominees

1990s

2000s

2010s

2020s

Superlatives

Trivia

Multiple winners
 3 wins
 James Gandolfini
 Jason Bateman
 2 wins
 Steve Buscemi
 Bryan Cranston
 Anthony Edwards
 Dennis Franz
 Hugh Laurie
 Martin Sheen
 Kevin Spacey
 Kiefer Sutherland

Multiple nominees

 8 nominations
 Dennis Franz

 7 nominations
 James Gandolfini

 6 nominations
 Peter Dinklage
 Michael C. Hall
 Jon Hamm
 Hugh Laurie

 5 nominations
 Sterling K. Brown
 Steve Buscemi
 Bryan Cranston
 David Duchovny
 Anthony Edwards
 Bob Odenkirk
 Martin Sheen
 Kiefer Sutherland

 4 nominations
 Jason Bateman
 Jimmy Smits
 Kevin Spacey

 3 nominations
 James Spader

 2 nominations
 George Clooney
 Billy Crudup
 Jeff Daniels
 David Harbour
 Peter Krause
 Anthony LaPaglia
 Rami Malek
 Sam Waterston
 Treat Williams

See also
 Primetime Emmy Award for Outstanding Lead Actor in a Drama Series
 Primetime Emmy Award for Outstanding Supporting Actor in a Drama Series
 Golden Globe Award for Best Actor – Television Series Drama

External links 
 SAG Awards official site

Male Actor Drama Series
 
Television awards for Best Actor